Heraclius I (Erekle I) or Nazar Alī Khān (1642–1709), of the Bagrationi dynasty, was a Georgian monarch who ruled the kingdoms of Kakheti (1675–1676, 1703–1709) and Kartli (1688–1703) under the protection of the Safavid dynasty of Iran.

Early life
He was son of Prince David of Kakheti (1612-1648), son of King Teimuraz I, by his wife Helene née Princess Diasamidze (died 1695). Taken to Russia when the pro-Persian king Rostom of Kartli defeated Teimuraz in 1648, he was raised and educated at the Romanov court at Moscow where he was known as Tsarevich Nicholas Davidovich. In 1662, he returned to take over the then-vacant crown of Kakheti at the invitation of local nobility, but was defeated by the rival prince Archil who enjoyed Iranian support.

Nicholas had to flee back to Russia where he featured prominently and was best man of Tsar Alexis Mikhailovich in his wedding to Natalia Naryshkina in 1671 and stood in high favor with the Russian court.

It is believed by some that he was a natural father of Peter the Great. The writer Aleksey Nikolayevich Tolstoy researching the biography of Peter the Great, informed Joseph Stalin that he had unearthed some documents which suggested Peter's father was a Georgian king. He thought he would ingratiate himself with Stalin by telling him this. Instead Stalin was appalled and forbade Tolstoy to mention the matter ever again.

Royal career

In Kakheti
In 1675, Archil conflicted with the shah's government, abandoned Kakheti and defected to the Ottoman Empire. Prince Nicholas capitalized on the ensuing turmoil, returned for a second time and was proclaimed as King of Kakheti Heraclius (Erekle) I. Earlier, in 1666, shah Suleiman I had succeeded Abbas II on the Iranian Safavid throne. In 1674, Suleiman I asked him to decisively end his stay in Russia, ordered him to Isfahan and promised to confirm him as king if Heraclius apostatized to Islam. The king refused to become Muslim and the shah's subject, citing the oath of allegiance given by his ancestor, Alexander II of Kakheti (r. 1574–1605), to Feodor I of Russia. Hence, he was deprived of the crown, being allowed, however, to settle to Isfahan. Kakheti was subsequently under direct Safavid rule.

In Kartli
In 1688, when the government of Iran declared its recalcitrant subject George XI of Kartli deposed, Heraclius acceded to the shah's pressure. He converted to Islam assuming the title of Nazar Alī Khān in 1676. In reward, Heraclius was confirmed as King of Kartli and given a Persian army to win over the crown. To buttress Heraclius's authority, the shah appointed 'Abbās-qolī Khan, formerly a beglarbeg of Ganja, as Persian viceroy in Kakheti (residing at Qara-Agach). The khan failed, however, to prevent George XI from staging a comeback in 1691 and blockading Heraclius (Nazar Alī Khān) in Tiflis, his capital. It was not until 1696 that George admitted defeat and came to Isfahan to offer his submission to the new shah, Soltan Hosayn.

At the same time, the shah grew increasingly dissatisfied with Nazar Alī Khān's administration. Having spent most of his life in Russia and Iran, his lack of knowledge of Georgian national traditions he had already estranged his subjects. A vacillating ruler, addicted to strong drink, though capable at times of being brave, philanthropic and reformist, he never really achieved a firm control of his possessions, or made himself popular with the populace of Kakheti. Meanwhile, George XI managed to gain the favor of Shah Hosayn and was reconfirmed as King of Kartli in 1703, while Nazar Alī Khān was removed from the throne and ordered to Isfahan where he was invested by Hosayn as King of Kakheti and appointed the commander of the shah's personal guard. He was never able to return to his kingdom, however, and died at the Persian capital in 1710, being succeeded on the throne by his son, David II (Imām Qulī Khān), who had run Kakheti during Nazar Alī Khān's absence at Isfahan.

Family

Heraclius I married, in 1677, Ana, daughter of Prince Shermazan Cholokashvili (died before April 1716). They were the parents of two sons and two daughters:
 David II (Imām Qulī Khān) (1678 – 2 November 1722), King of Kakheti (1703/1709–1722).
 Princess Elene (Banjanum) (1687 – 27 April 1750), who in 1715 married King Jesse of Kartli.
 Teimuraz II (c. 1690 – 8 January 1762), King of Kakheti (1729–1736, 1738–1744) and of Kartli (1744–1762).
 Princess Ketevan (died 1718), who married Prince Abel Andronikashvili.
 Princess Mariam (c. 1698 – 1732), who married in 1714 Prince Edisher Cholokashvili and became a nun in widowhood, with the name of Makrine. She was a hymnist and copyist of religious texts.

Heraclius I also had several natural children born of unknown concubines, of which better known are:

 Constantine II (Mahmād Qulī Khān) (died 28 December 1732), King of Kakheti (1722–1732).
 Ketevan-Begum (died 1752), who married c. 1742 Prince Abdullah Beg of Kartli.

Little is known of Heraclius's other children:

 Ismail
 Rostom (1685–1703)
 Vakhtang (died 1695)
 Demetre (1688–1700)
 Gorgasal (died 1697)
 George
 Reza Quli Mirza
 Mustafa Mirza

Ancestry

References

Sources
Lang, David Marshall (1957), The Last Years of the Georgian Monarchy, 1658-1832. New York: Columbia University Press.
Mikaberidze, Alexander (ed., 2007). Erekle I. Dictionary of Georgian National Biography. Accessed October 9, 2007.
 

1642 births
1709 deaths
Bagrationi dynasty of the Kingdom of Kakheti
Safavid appointed kings of Kartli
Safavid appointed kings of Kakheti
Converts to Shia Islam from Eastern Orthodoxy
Former Georgian Orthodox Christians
Iranian people of Georgian descent
Shia Muslims from Georgia (country)
17th-century people of Safavid Iran
18th-century people of Safavid Iran